Massachusetts House of Representatives' 8th Hampden district in the United States is one of 160 legislative districts included in the lower house of the Massachusetts General Court. It covers part of the city of Chicopee in Hampden County. Democrat Joseph Wagner of Chicopee has represented the district since 1991.

The current district geographic boundary overlaps with those of the Massachusetts Senate's 1st Hampden and Hampshire district, 2nd Hampden and Hampshire district, and Hampden district.

Representatives
 Elbridge G. Pierce, circa 1858 
 George L. Wright, circa 1859 
 Charles Henry Bennett, circa 1888 
 Charles Amos Call, circa 1888 
 Leo P. Senecal (Republican), 1920-1925 
 Daniel J. Coakley (Democrat), 1925-1927 
 Julius F. Carman (Republican), 1927-1929 
 Richard H. Stacy (Republican), 1929-1941 
 Archie Edward Bruce (Republican), 1941-49 
 Philip Kimball (Republican), 1949-1969 
 John P. O'Brien (Democrat), 1969-1973
 Peter H. Lappin (Democrat), 1973-1975
 James E. O'Leary (Democrat), 1975 
 Robert J. Rohan (Democrat), 1976-79
 Richard H. Demers (Democrat), 1979-1981
 Kenneth M. Lemanski (Democrat), 1981-1991 (1982-84 as Republican, 1984-91 as Democrat)
 Joseph Wagner (Democrat), 1991-2023 
 Shirley Arriaga (Democrat), 2023-Current

Former locale
The district previously covered Westfield, circa 1872.

See also
 List of Massachusetts House of Representatives elections
 Other Hampden County districts of the Massachusetts House of Representatives: 1st, 2nd, 3rd, 4th, 5th, 6th, 7th, 9th, 10th, 11th, 12th
 Hampden County districts of the Massachusett Senate: Berkshire, Hampshire, Franklin, and Hampden; Hampden; 1st Hampden and Hampshire; 2nd Hampden and Hampshire
 List of Massachusetts General Courts
 List of former districts of the Massachusetts House of Representatives

Images
Portraits of legislators

References

External links
 Ballotpedia
  (State House district information based on U.S. Census Bureau's American Community Survey).

House
Government of Hampden County, Massachusetts